Spatulifimbria is a genus of stinging cup moths described by George Hampson in 1893.

Species
There are currently two species:

Spatulifimbria castaneiceps Hampson, 1892
Spatulifimbria grisea Hering, 1935

References

Moths of Asia
Limacodidae
Insects described in 1893